Pauline Oliveros (May 30, 1932 – November 24, 2016) was an American composer, accordionist and a central figure in the development of post-war experimental and electronic music.

She was a founding member of the San Francisco Tape Music Center in the 1960s, and served as its director. She taught music at Mills College, the University of California, San Diego (UCSD), Oberlin Conservatory of Music, and Rensselaer Polytechnic Institute. Oliveros authored books, formulated new music theories, and investigated new ways to focus attention on music including her concepts of "deep listening" and "sonic awareness", drawing on metaphors from cybernetics. She was an Eyebeam resident.

Early life and career
Oliveros was born in Houston, Texas. She started to play music as early as kindergarten, and at nine years of age she began to play the accordion, received from her mother, a pianist, because of its popularity in the 1940s. She later went on to learn violin, piano, tuba and French horn for grade school and college music. At the age of sixteen she resolved to become a composer.

Oliveros arrived in California and supported herself with a day job, and supplemented this by giving accordion lessons. From there Oliveros went on to attend Moores School of Music at the University of Houston, studying with Willard A. Palmer, and earned a BFA degree in composition from San Francisco State College, where her teachers included composer Robert Erickson, with whom she had private lessons and who mentored her for six to seven years. This is also where she met artists Terry Riley, Stuart Dempster and Loren Rush.

When Oliveros turned 21, she obtained her first tape recording deck, which led to her creating her own pieces and future projects in this field. Oliveros was one of the original members of the San Francisco Tape Music Center, which was an important resource for electronic music on the U.S. West Coast during the 1960s. The Center later moved to Mills College, with Oliveros serving as its first director; it was renamed the Center for Contemporary Music. 

Oliveros often improvised with the Expanded Instrument System, an electronic signal processing system she designed, in her performances and recordings. Oliveros held Honorary Doctorates in Music from the University of Maryland (Baltimore County), Mills College (Oakland, California), and De Montfort University (Leicester, England, UK).

UCSD
In 1967, Oliveros left Mills to take a faculty music department position at the University of California, San Diego. There, Oliveros met theoretical physicist and karate master Lester Ingber, with whom she collaborated in defining the attentional process as applied to music listening. She also studied karate under Ingber, achieving black belt level. In 1973, Oliveros conducted studies at the University's one-year-old Center for Music Experiment; she served as the center's director from 1976 to 1979. In 1981, to escape creative constriction, she left her tenured position as full Professor of Music at University of California, San Diego and relocated to upstate New York to become an independent composer, performer, and consultant.

Deep listening

In 1988, as a result of descending 14 feet into the Dan Harpole underground cistern in Port Townsend, Washington, to make a recording, Oliveros coined the term "deep listening"—a pun that has blossomed into "an aesthetic based upon principles of improvisation, electronic music, ritual, teaching and meditation. This aesthetic is designed to inspire both trained and untrained performers to practice the art of listening and responding to environmental conditions in solo and ensemble situations". Dempster, Oliveros and Panaiotis then formed the Deep Listening Band, and deep listening became a program of the Pauline Oliveros Foundation, founded in 1985. The Deep Listening program includes annual listening retreats in Europe, New Mexico and in upstate New York, as well as apprenticeship and certification programs. The Pauline Oliveros Foundation changed its name to Deep Listening Institute, Ltd., in 2005. The Deep Listening Band, which included Oliveros, David Gamper (1947–2011) and Stuart Dempster, specializes in performing and recording in resonant or reverberant spaces such as caves, cathedrals and huge underground cisterns. They have collaborated with Ellen Fullman and her long-string instrument, as well as countless other musicians, dancers and performers. The Center for Deep Listening at Rensselaer (CDL@RPI), initially under the direction of Tomie Hahn, is now established and is the steward of the former Deep Listening Institute. A celebratory concert was held on March 11, 2015, at the Experimental Media and Performing Arts Center (EMPAC) at the Rensselaer Polytechnic Institute in Troy, New York. Stephanie Loveless is the current director of the CDL@RPI.

Sonic awareness

Heidi Von Gunden names a new musical theory developed by Oliveros, "sonic awareness", and describes it as "the ability to consciously focus attention upon environmental and musical sound", requiring "continual alertness and an inclination to be always listening" and which she describes as comparable to John Berger's concept of visual consciousness (as in his Ways of Seeing). Oliveros discusses this theory in the "Introductions" to her Sonic Meditations and in articles. Von Gunden describes sonic awareness as "a synthesis of the psychology of consciousness, the physiology of the martial arts, and the sociology of the feminist movement", and describes two ways of processing information, "attention and awareness", or focal attention and global attention, which may be represented by a dot and circle, respectively, a symbol Oliveros commonly employs in compositions such as Rose Moon (1977) and El Rilicario de los Animales (1979). (The titles of Oliveros' pieces Rose Moon and Rose Mountain refer to her romantic partner Linda Montano having gone by Rose Mountain at one time.) Later this representation was expanded, with the symbol quartered and the quarters representing "actively making sound", "actually imagining sound", "listening to present sound" and "remembering past sound", with this model used in Sonic Meditations. Practice of the theory creates "complex sound masses possessing a strong tonal center".

Other
Oliveros taught at Rensselaer Polytechnic Institute and Mills College. She was born in Houston, Texas in 1932, and died in 2016 in Kingston, New York.

While attending the University of Houston, she was a member of the band program and helped form the Tau chapter of Tau Beta Sigma Honorary Band Sorority.

She was openly lesbian. In 1975 Oliveros met her eventual partner, performance artist Linda Montano. The titles of Oliveros' pieces Rose Moon and Rose Mountain refer to Montano having gone by Rose Mountain at one time.

Annie Sprinkle’s 1992 production The Sluts and Goddesses Video Workshop – Or How To Be A Sex Goddess in 101 Easy Steps, which was co-produced and co-directed with videographer Maria Beatty, featured music by Oliveros.

Oliveros received a 1994 Foundation for Contemporary Arts Grants to Artists award.

In 2007, Oliveros received the Resounding Vision Award from Nameless Sound.

She contributed a chapter to Sound Unbound: Sampling Digital Music and Culture (The MIT Press, 2008) edited by Paul D. Miller a.k.a. DJ Spooky.

She was the 2009 recipient of the William Schuman Award, from Columbia University School of the Arts.

Oliveros was the author of five books, Sounding the Margins: Collected Writings 1992–2009, Initiation Dream, Software for People, The Roots of the Moment, and Deep Listening: A Composer's Sound Practice.

In 2012, Oliveros received the John Cage Award from the Foundation for Contemporary Arts.

Some of her music was featured in the 2014 French video game NaissanceE.

Oliveros' work Deep Listening Room was featured in the 2014 Whitney Biennial.

Oliveros was a member of Avatar Orchestra Metaverse, a global collaboration of composers, artists and musicians that approaches the virtual reality platform Second Life as an instrument itself.

She was also a patron of Soundart Radio in Dartington, Devon.

Notable works
 Sonic Meditations: "Teach Yourself to Fly", etc.
 Sound Patterns for mixed chorus (1961), awarded the Gaudeamus International Composers Award in 1962, available on Extended Voices (Odyssey 32 16) 0156 and 20th Century Choral Music (Ars Nova AN-1005)
 I of IV, included in the collection New Sounds in Electronic Music, published by Odyssey Records, 1967
 Music for Annie Sprinkle's The Sluts and Goddesses Video Workshop—Or How To Be A Sex Goddess in 101 Easy Steps (1992)
 Theater of Substitution series (1975–?). Oliveros was photographed as different characters, including a Spanish señora, a polyester clad suburban housewife, and a professor in robes. Jackson Mac Low played Oliveros at the New York Philharmonic's "A Celebration of Women composers" concert on November 10, 1975, and Oliveros has played Mac Low (see Mac Low's "being Pauline: narrative of a substitution", Big Deal, Fall 1976). (ibid, p. 141)
 Crone Music (1989)
 Six for New Time (1999), music score for Sonic Youth
 "the Space Between with Matthew Sperry", (2003) 482Music

Books

Notable students

Films
 1976 – Music with Roots in the Aether: Opera for Television. Tape 5: Pauline Oliveros. Produced and directed by Robert Ashley. New York: Lovely Music.
 1993 – The Sensual Nature of Sound: 4 Composers – Laurie Anderson, Tania León, Meredith Monk, Pauline Oliveros. Directed by Michael Blackwood.
 2001 – Roulette TV: Pauline Oliveros. Roulette Intermedium Inc.
 2005 – Unyazi of the Bushveld. Directed by Aryan Kaganof. Produced by African Noise Foundation.
 2020 – Sisters With Transistors. Directed by Lisa Rovner.

References

Further reading
 Zimmerman, Walter, Desert Plants – Conversations with 23 American Musicians, Berlin: Beginner Press in cooperation with Mode Records, 2020 (originally published in 1976 by A.R.C., Vancouver). The 2020 edition includes a cd featuring the original interview recordings with Larry Austin, Robert Ashley, Jim Burton, John Cage, Philip Corner, Morton Feldman, Philip Glass, Joan La Barbara, Garrett List, Alvin Lucier, John McGuire, Charles Morrow, J.B. Floyd (on Conlon Nancarrow), Pauline Oliveros, Charlemagne Palestine, Ben Johnston (on Harry Partch), Steve Reich, David Rosenboom, Frederic Rzewski, Richard Teitelbaum, James Tenney, Christian Wolff, and La Monte Young.

External links 

 
 Deep Listening Institute
 Pauline Oliveros Foundation 
 Rensselaer Polytechnic Institute: Faculty and Staff: Pauline Oliveros, Clinical Professor, Arts Department, School of Humanities, Arts, and Social Sciences
 The Sonic Rituals of Pauline Oliveros by Ron Drummond
 EST Interview
 Pauline Oliveros in conversation with Frank J. Oteri 
 Listen to an excerpt of Oliveros' Alien Bog at Acousmata music blog
 Interview with Pauline Oliveros by Bruce Duffie, April 5, 1996
 Interview with Pauline Oliveros by Lutz Felbick, July 10, 1999
 Pauline Oliveros Papers MSS 102. Special Collections & Archives, UC San Diego Library
 Pauline Oliveros Papers in the Music Division of The New York Public Library for the Performing Arts
 Pauline Oliveros' entry, UbuWeb Film
 Pauline Oliveros' entry, UbuWeb Sound
 Pauline Oliveros Interview – NAMM Oral History Library (2016)
 exhibit in Athens, Greece, documenta 14, featuring many of Oliveros's manuscripts

Listening
 Dear.John: A Canon on the Name of Cage on Larry Polansky's Home Page
 Epitonic.com: Deep Listening Band featuring a track from Deep Listening
 Art of the States: Pauline Oliveros, two works by the composer
  at SASSAS

1932 births
2016 deaths
20th-century classical composers
20th-century American composers
20th-century women composers
20th-century American women musicians
American women composers
21st-century classical composers
21st-century American composers
21st-century women composers
21st-century American women musicians
American classical composers
American women classical composers
American women in electronic music
American accordionists
Avant-garde accordionists
Classical musicians from Texas
Experimental composers
Gaudeamus Composition Competition prize-winners
Just intonation composers
American lesbian musicians
LGBT classical composers
LGBT classical musicians
LGBT people from California
Mills College faculty
Musicians from Houston
Rensselaer Polytechnic Institute faculty
University of California, San Diego faculty
Pupils of Robert Erickson
Pupils of Seymour Shifrin
Sub Rosa Records artists
Women accordionists
American women academics
Women sound artists
20th-century LGBT people
21st-century LGBT people
Cyberneticists